Portage Island is an island in the western part of Bellingham Bay in Whatcom County, Washington, United States. It is separated from the Lummi Peninsula by Portage Bay and from the central part of Lummi Island by Hale Passage, in Whatcom County. Portage Island has a land area of 3.803 km² (1.468 sq mi). There was no resident population as of the 2000 census.  According to  the Whatcom County Assessors database, the land and the surrounding tide flats are owned by the Lummi Native American tribe.  The island is wholly contained within the boundaries of the Lummi Indian Reservation.

References
Portage Island: Blocks 3001 and 3002, Census Tract 108, Whatcom County, Washington United States Census Bureau

Landforms of Whatcom County, Washington
Uninhabited islands of Washington (state)